S. nigricans may refer to:
 Santiria nigricans, a plant species
 Sayornis nigricans, the black phoebe, a bird species
 Scambus nigricans, an ichmeunon wasp species found in the United Kingdom
 Serpophaga nigricans, the sooty tyrannulet, a bird species
 Siphona nigricans, Villeneuve, 1930, a fly species in the genus Siphona
 Stegastes nigricans, a damselfish species
 Strophius nigricans, Keyserling, 1880, a spider species in the genus Strophius and the family  Thomisidae found in Trinidad, Peru, Brazil and Paraguay

Synonyms
 Salix nigricans, a synonym for Salix myrsinifolia, a willow species native to Europe and Western Siberia

See also
 Nigricans (disambiguation)